The golden-mantled howler (Alouatta palliata palliata) is a subspecies of the mantled howler, A. palliata. It ranges throughout much of Central America, in Guatemala, Honduras, Nicaragua and Costa Rica, and possibly Panama. The range limits between the golden-mantled howler and the Ecuadorian mantled howler are not entirely clear. The Ecuadorian mantled howler replaces the golden-mantled howler in either extreme eastern Costa Rica or western Panama.

The golden-mantled howler differs from the Ecuadorian mantled howler primarily by being darker, with a mantle that is more rufous than yellowish. The golden-mantled howler differs from the Mexican howler monkey primarily in aspects of skull morphology.

References

golden-mantled howler
Primates of Central America
golden-mantled howler
golden-mantled howler